The 2009 Rally America season was the fifth season of Rally America. The season consisted of 9 rallies and began on January 30, with the Sno* Drift National Rally in Michigan.  The final stage of Rally in the 100 Acre Wood was canceled due to impassable conditions. With six victories, Travis Pastrana claimed his fourth Rally America championship in succession.

Schedule

 † Though not a part of the Rally America season, nearly all competitors will be from Rally America.

X Games 15
The X Games had a super stage rally event for their event.  This marked 4th time the event was in the X Games, and featured at least 10 drivers from Rally America in head to head competition in a cross over course.  8 of the drivers have already been chosen, including Pastrana, Block, and Foust.

Driver standings
Though Rally America runs 2 other classes, Super Production and Front Wheel Drive, these are not nearly as heavily contested. Travis Pastrana secured his fourth straight championship during the Ojibwe Forests Rally. Foust and Comrie-Picard were unable to attend.

This is only a list of the top finishers, a full list with details can be seen at the Rally America website.

References

External links
Rally America
Rally America Videos

Rally America seasons
Rally America
America